Blood Rites (original title: The Ghastly Ones) is a 1968 American horror film directed by Andy Milligan. The film is about three sisters who arrive at their father's house according to his dying wish and are soon brutally murdered one by one.

Plot 
Three sisters, Veronica, Victoria, and Elizabeth, receive letters from their late father's lawyer informing them of their father's wish that they spend three nights in his house on an isolated island before his will can be read. They and their husbands, William, Richard and Donald, are met there by the two maids, Martha and Ruth, and a hunchback named Colin, whom the audience has already seen murdering two people at the beginning of the film. While helping with the luggage, Colin becomes angry and catches and eats a live rabbit. The rabbit remains are later found in Veronica and William's bed, along with a note reading, "Blessed are the meek for they shall inherit."

Victoria and Robert find that someone has painted a large 'X' in blood on their bedroom door. Robert and Donald go downstairs to investigate, but Donald collapses after being drugged. Robert investigates the cellar and sees someone he recognizes. Shortly afterward, Victoria finds his body hanging by the ankles on the stairs. The next morning, while discussing what happened, Ruth asks Martha if she had tied up Colin that night.

Colin attempts to tell Victoria something but is interrupted by Martha and sent to chop firewood in the cellar with Donald (who is given a leather strap to use on Colin). Donald finds a plank of wood with a bloody 'X' on it but is attacked from behind, gagged and bound to a workbench before being disemboweled and cut in two by a hooded figure.

At dinner, the guests ask about Donald and Elizabeth's whereabouts. Eventually, Elizabeth's severed head is found in the serving dish when dinner is served.

William goes into the cellar to investigate and finds a box and a photograph. However, Colin steals the photo from him, and William is then attacked and killed with a pitchfork by the hooded figure. Later, Martha finds Colin with the photograph and realizes what it means but is killed with a hatchet. Colin tries to escape from the killer but is set alight.

It is revealed that Ruth is in fact Hattie, the fourth and eldest sister, and she had planned to kill the others and blame Colin so that she could claim the inheritance. Colin is still alive, however, and pushes her down the stairs, causing her hatchet to bury itself in her head. The two remaining sisters, Veronica and Victoria, are left staring in disbelief.

Cast 
 Veronica Radburn as Martha
 Maggie Rogers as Hattie
 Hal Borske as Colin Trask
 Anne Linden as Vicky
 Fib LaBlaque as Rich
 Carol Vogel as Liz
 Richard Romanus as Don
 Eileen Hayes as Veronica
 Don Williams as Bill
 Hal Sherwood as Walter
 Neil Flanagan as Lawyer Dobbs
 Ada McAllister as Ada
 Robert Adsit as Robert

Production 

Blood Rites marked Andy Milligan's first color film. In order to find a setting for the film, Milligan scouted for locations where he could film in Staten Island, in which he found an old country estate that was built in the late 1800s. Because of the film's extremely low budget of around $13,000, Milligan held several different roles during production. On top of being the film's writer and director, Milligan also worked as the film's costume designer and created all the costumes himself. The camera equipment used in filming was all owned by Milligan so he didn't have to rent equipment in order to film, this also cut production costs by over $2,000. Milligan also filmed the movie on short ends; using old and leftover 16mm film reels from other local film productions.

The film's gory special effects were limited and had to be used effectively under a limited budget. This included using organs from animals and other practical effects.

Release

Home media
The film was released for the first time on DVD by Image Entertainment on January 13, 2004 as a part of a special edition, which also included Seeds of Sin.

Reception 

The Ghastly Ones has received almost universally negative reviews from critics. DVD Verdict wrote "[Blood Rites] is the only horror film where the aspects of the filmmaking are far more frightening than the slayings themselves". It was awarded a score of 0 out of 4 by VideoHound's Golden Movie Retriever, panning the film's budget and perceived lack of talent. TV Guide gave the film no stars out of five, criticizing the film's noticeable no-budget.

Todd Martin from HorrorNews.net liked the film, writing, " It isn’t perfect by a long shot but it is watchable and is a lot of fun in its own odd way. Give it a shot if you are a fan of Milligan’s or just if you like low budget flicks that are interesting and fun. I dug it and I think if you give it a chance you will too if you don’t take it too seriously."

Remake 

Director Milligan remade the film in 1978 as Legacy of Blood.

See also
List of American films of 1968

References

External links 
 
 
 
 
 

1968 films
1968 horror films
1960s serial killer films
American independent films
American serial killer films
American splatter films
Films set on islands
1960s English-language films
Films directed by Andy Milligan
1960s American films